Žabljek is a village in the Municipality of Slovenska Bistrica in northeastern Slovenia. The area is part of the traditional region of Styria. It is now included with the rest of the municipality in the Drava Statistical Region.

A chapel in the centre of the settlement is dedicated to the Sacred Heart of Jesus and belongs to the Laporje parish.

References

External links
Žabljek at Geopedia

Populated places in the Municipality of Slovenska Bistrica